Menka Shivdasani is Indian poet. In 1986, she co-founded The Poetry Circle in Bombay, with Nitin Mukadam and Akil Contractor.

Bibliography

Poetry books
Nirvana at Ten Rupees published by XAL-Praxis Foundation, Mumbai .1990 
  Stet, first published in 2001 by Sampark 
Safe House published by Paperwall (Poetrywala), Mumbai . 2015
Frazil published by Paperwall (Poetrywala), Mumbai . 2018

Editor

 Anthology of Contemporary Indian Poetry (2004) ed. by Menka Shivdasani and published by Michael Rothenberg, Big Bridge United States.
Freedom and fissures (1998): an anthology of Sindhi partition poetry published by Sahitya Akademi, India.
 If the Roof Leaks, Let it Leak, an anthology of writing by Indian women, Sound and Picture Archives for Research on Women, 2014

Interview

 "A book must be a distillation of a lifetime’s worth of thought, feeling and experience"
 "Proud of being a Woman, an Indian and a Sindhi" Menka Shivdasani
 "Menka Shivdasani : Five Minutes With is a series of interviews with contemporary poets from India" Menka Shivdasani''

See also

Indian English Poetry
Indian poetry in English

References

External links
Menka Shivdasani's : For Many Poets in Mega City like Mumbai...

Living people
Indian women poets
English-language poets from India
Writers from Mumbai
Indian magazine editors
Women magazine editors
21st-century Indian women writers
21st-century Indian poets
Poets from Maharashtra
Women writers from Maharashtra
Year of birth missing (living people)